Poser (and Poser Pro) is a 3D computer graphics program distributed by Bondware. Poser is optimized for the 3D modeling of human figures. By enabling beginners to produce basic animations and digital images, along with the extensive availability of third-party digital 3D models, it has attained much popularity.

Overview 
Poser is a 3D rendering software package for the posing, animating and rendering of 3D poly-mesh human and animal figures. Similar to a virtual photography studio, Poser allows the user to load figures, props, lighting and cameras for both still and animated renderings.

Using a subset of the Alias object (OBJ) file format and a text-based markup for content files, Poser comes with a large library of pre-rigged human, animal, robotic, and cartoon figures. The package also includes poses, hairpieces, props, textures, hand gestures and facial expressions. As Poser itself does not allow for original modeling of objects, a large community market of artists has emerged, in which Poser content is created and sold through various third party channels.

Poser is available in multiple languages including English, Japanese, German and French. Poser is available for both Microsoft Windows and Mac OS X operating systems. While Poser's interface has evolved since the product's introduction in 1995, the current Poser 11 and Poser Pro 11 preserve many of the application's original interface elements so that legacy users can move into the newest version and navigate without relearning the program's controls.

Features 
Poser includes a library of pre-built, ready-to-use content including body and hand poses, materials, props, facial expressions, hairpieces, lights, cameras and scenes, and a Reyes-based render engine called Firefly which supports nodes for the creation of complex materials. Furthermore, it provides import of sound, image, and video files, motion capture data and 3D content for the creation of scenes or the addition of new library items. Poser exports content in many 3D formats. Poser is capable of material editing, facial photo matching, dynamic hair, dynamic cloth and new figure rigging. Online content is also available. Python enables third-party developers to create additional features ranging from custom libraries, rendering engine control panels, metadata editors and utility scripts.

Usage 
Poser is a digital stage that gives the user total control. Poser is used to create original images ranging from human figures, human renderings of medical and industrial design illustrations, editorial illustrations, informational graphics, graphic novel illustrations, comics, and much more.

Poser contains many animation capabilities and is regularly employed by broadcast professionals including animation staff at Fox Bones, Colbert Report and Jimmy Kimmel Live!, as well as in industry applications, such as in the animated instructions for automated checkout machines at Albertsons, Save-On stores and Wal-Mart, and in at least a few full-length films including Star Trek fan-film, Star Trek: Aurora,  The Misty Green Sky, and The Exigency. Poser characters and animations were used for early computer games from 'buddies' game creators ("Desert Rifle" games and "Cake shop" from Qi and ELEFUN(TM) game developers).

Standard Poser characters have been extensively used by European and US-based documentary production teams to graphically render the human body or virtual actors in digital scenes. Humanoids printed in several science and technology magazines around the US are often Poser-rendered and post-worked models.

A film animated entirely on Poser, titled The Exigency, took thirteen years to produce and was released on December 14, 2019.

Library 
Poser is packaged with ready-to-use 3D content that allows new users to get started without immediately needing to purchase additional content. Items are stored in Poser's drag-and-drop-enabled Library and are organized by type and name, e.g. People/Ryan2. Users can save customized figures or objects into the Library in order to reuse those items at a later point in time. The Library also supports adding in additional "Runtimes" which are collections of content that legacy users have assembled from third party providers.

The Library includes a configurable, keyword-based Search function that locates content in the Library or connected Runtimes. Content can also be added to the Library's Favorites for quick access.

The Library is set up with categories that each include collections of similar content items:

Character
 Pre-rigged figures including anatomically accurate humans, mannikins, animals, insects, dinosaurs, cartoon characters, human anatomies such as skeletons, and musculature and mechanical figures such as vehicles
Pose
 Animated and static poses for human and animals covering day-to-day activities, dancing, walking, standing, and sitting, as well as action and sport poses
Face
 Includes full and partial facial expressions
Hair
 Includes prop-based transparency-mapped hairpieces, dynamic hairpieces, and hair props such as mustaches or sideburns
Hand
 Hand poses of various types such as action poses and gestures, signals, counting, and American Sign Language
Props
 Includes primitives such as spheres and cylinders, clothing items grouped by character, scene props, furniture, rooms, vehicles, plants, and cartoon elements
Lights
 Includes animated or static pre-set lights consisting of spotlights, infinite lights, point lights, diffuse IBL lights
Cameras
 Includes animated or static cameras
Materials
 Includes simple and complex node-based materials
Scenes
 Full Poser scenes including a Factory, Crime Scene Lab, and a modern Apartment.

History 
Poser was created by artist and programmer Larry Weinberg as a digital replacement for artist's mannequins. Versions 1.0 and 2.0 were published by Fractal Design. In 1997, Fractal Design was acquired by MetaCreations, and Poser's interface was redesigned by MetaCreations' Phil Clevenger for release as Poser 3 in 1998. This interface has remained as the basis for all subsequent versions. In 1999, MetaCreations sold Poser to egi.sys AG, which established the subsidiary Curious Labs, with Larry Weinberg as CEO to handle Poser development and publication. Curious Labs and Poser were sold to e-frontier, in 2003. In November 2007, Smith Micro Software acquired Poser as well as Anime Studio (now called Moho). Smith Micro Software also acquired the English language distribution rights to Manga Studio (now called Clip Studio Paint), from e-Frontier. The latest "stable" versions of Poser were released in September 2019; Poser 12 is currently in open beta, meaning you can purchase it but it will have bugs.  Poser 11 introduced many new features, including better rigging capabilities.

Early versions of Poser were bundled with fully clothed humanoid figures specifically designed for Poser. As the program evolved, add-on packages of human figures were sold by the manufacturer of Poser, and eventually, third-party companies began creating figures which work with Poser. As clothing became separate from the humanoid figure, collections of 3D garments were created for specific models which conform to the shape and pose of the Poser figure. 'Poses' for figures were packaged and sold by the software vendor and by third parties. 'Morphs', allowing customization of body or face shape or other features, are also sold. Different skin textures, frequently combined with settings for morph technology, are marketed to allow one base model to be customized into many different 'characters'. Similarly 'texture' packages allow one garment to take on many different appearances, an animal to represent different breeds of the same species or a vehicle to show many different color schemes.

On July 2, 2009, Smith Micro Software announced the creation of a new platform for distribution of assets for use in Poser called Content Paradise.

On November 9, 2018, Smith Micro Software announced the closure of Content Paradise on December 3, 2018, the content moved to Renderosity.

On June 20, 2019, Smith Micro Software announced they sold the product line of its Poser software to Bondware, Inc., owner of the popular online marketplace, Renderosity.com, and longtime Smith Micro resale partner.

Poser figures 
Poser's specially designed figures are commonly known as Poser Figures, Poser Models, Poser Content, Digital Actors, or Digital Puppets. Early versions of Poser were bundled with fully clothed humanoid figures specifically designed for the then-current version of Poser. Next, add-on packages of human figures were sold by the manufacturer of Poser. Soon, third party companies began creating figures which work with Poser. As clothing became separate from the humanoid figure, collections of 3D garments were created for specific models which conform to the shape and pose of the Poser figure. 'Poses' for figures were packaged and sold by the software vendor and by third parties. 'Morphs' allowing customization of body or face shape or other features are also for sale. Skin textures, frequently combined with settings for morph technology, are marketed to allow one base model to be customized into many 'characters'; similar 'texture' packages allow one garment to take on many appearances, an animal to represent different breeds of the same species, or a vehicle to show many colour schemes.

Development of figures 
Each major release of Poser has come with a new generation of figures for use with the tool, however separate figures rapidly became available as the content market developed. Notably Zygote (later Daz 3D) made a Poser model of a young woman, higher-resolution than Posette, and called her "the Millennium Girl". Poser users often colloquially shortened this name to "Millie". Zygote, disliking this name, officially named her Victoria, which is often colloquially shortened to Vicky. Victoria then became the initial member of a large family of figures which has developed across multiple generations of technology. After they merged with Gizmoz in late 2009, Daz 3D released all their Poser figures as free downloads, but withdrew the free versions of their pre-Genesis figures when Genesis was released.

Content market 
Because Poser figures are very inexpensive and useful for commercial illustrators, an entire cottage industry has developed to create and market Poser figures and other content. The market is a combination of several large distributors, who often also develop products, and of individual artists who often use one or more of the larger distributors to handle the sale of their products. Both the distributors and individual artists are involved in the creation of Poser figures, clothing, poses, morphs, textures and characters.

Figure families 

Rather than unconnected single figures, Poser figures are now generally produced as families of models linked by technology generation and creator.  Certain add-on products, most often poses and skin textures, but including some clothing models, may be usable across more than one model within a family, but in general are not usable across different generations of the same model. Examples of notable families of models are:

See also 
 3D modeling
 List of 3D modeling software

References

External links 

 

3D graphics software
3D animation software
Macintosh graphics software
Windows graphics-related software
MacOS graphics-related software
Anatomical simulation